The 2014 Santos Tour Down Under was the 16th edition of the Tour Down Under stage race. It took place from 21 to 26 January in and around Adelaide, South Australia, and was the first race of the 2014 UCI World Tour.

The race was won for a record third time by Australian national champion Simon Gerrans of the  team, after taking the lead on the penultimate stage of the race and held the race leader's ochre jersey to the finish, the next day, in Adelaide. Gerrans also won the opening stage of the race in Angaston. Like Gerrans, Ulissi and Evans both won stages of the race, winning in Stirling and Campbelltown respectively, while Evans also held the race lead for two days. The other stages were won by  rider André Greipel (two wins) and Richie Porte, who won the queen stage at Willunga Hill.

The race's other classifications were swept by Australian riders, as Gerrans' consistent finishes – five top-five stage finishes from six stages – across the week ensured that he won the blue jersey for the sprints classification, while  rider Adam Hansen was the winner of the mountains classification. UniSA-Australia's Jack Haig was the winner of the young rider classification, finishing seventeenth overall, while the teams classification was won by Gerrans'  outfit, also placing Daryl Impey inside the top ten overall.

Schedule

Participating teams
As the Tour Down Under is a UCI World Tour event, all 18 UCI ProTeams were invited automatically and obligated to send a squad. Australian team  received a wildcard invitation and together with a selection of Australian riders forming the UniSA-Australia squad, this formed the event's 20-team peloton.

The 20 teams invited to the race were:

Stages

Stage 1
21 January 2014 — Nuriootpa to Angaston,

Stage 2
22 January 2014 — Prospect to Stirling,

Stage 3
23 January 2014 — Norwood to Campbelltown,

Stage 4
24 January 2014 — Unley to Victor Harbor,

Stage 5
25 January 2014 — McLaren Vale to Willunga Hill,

Stage 6
26 January 2014 — Adelaide (criterium),

Classification leadership table
In the 2014 Tour Down Under, four different jerseys were awarded. For the general classification, calculated by adding each cyclist's finishing times on each stage, the leader received an ochre jersey. This classification was considered the most important of the 2014 Tour Down Under, and the winner of the classification was considered the winner of the race.

Additionally, there was a sprints classification, which awarded a blue jersey. In the sprints classification, cyclists received points for finishing in the top 15 in a stage. For winning a stage, a rider earned 15 points, with one point fewer per place down to a single point for 15th place. Points towards the classification could also be accrued at intermediate sprint points during each stage; these intermediate sprints also offered bonus seconds towards the general classification. There was also a mountains classification, the leadership of which was marked by a white jersey. In the mountains classification, points were won by reaching the top of a climb before other cyclists, with more points available for the higher-categorised climbs.

The fourth jersey represented the young rider classification, marked by a grey, green and pink jersey. This was decided in the same way as the general classification, but only riders born after 1 January 1988 were eligible to be ranked in the classification. There was also a classification for teams, in which the times of the best three cyclists per team on each stage were added together; the leading team at the end of the race was the team with the lowest total time, and each member of the winning team received a red jersey on the final podium. Additionally, a green jersey was awarded on the podium each day, for the most aggressive rider, or riders, of that day's stage.

References

External links

Tour Down Under
Tour Down Under
Tour Down Under
Tour